The British National Road Race Championships cover different categories of British road bicycle racing events, normally held annually.

History
Between 1943 and 1958, two separate bodies – the British League of Racing Cyclists (BLRC) and the National Cyclists' Union (NCU) – ran championships in competition with each other.

Between 1946 and 1958 the BLRC's championships were split into two, an amateur race and the independent championship for semi-professional riders. 

Women's championships were introduced by the BLRC in 1947, and by the NCU in 1956. 

In 1959, the NCU and the BLRC merged to create the British Cycling Federation.

Separate amateur and professional men's championships were held from 1959 until 1995.

In recent years the under 23 and senior races have been combined, which has caused some confusion in the interpretation of UCI rules.

Jersey

The winner of the road race gets to wear the National Champions jersey, which is white with red and blue bands, in races so that (s)he can be identified.

Men

From 1996

Professional (1959–1995)

Amateur (1959–1995)

BLRC

BLRC Independent Road Race (1946–1958)

BLRC (1943–1958)

NCU (1938–1958)

Under 23

Junior (Under 18)

All time medal table 
 Updated after 2017 Championships.
Medal table includes only medals achieved in elite (senior) events. Riders with 2 or more medals. (Table Excludes BLRC & NCU wins)

Women

Senior (From 1959)

NCU (1956–1958)

BLRC (1947–1958)

Under 23

Junior (Under 18)

References

External links

 

Cycle races in the United Kingdom
National road cycling championships
National championships in the United Kingdom
Annual sporting events in the United Kingdom